This is a list of coolest stars discovered, arranged by decreasing temperature. The stars with temperatures lower than 2,000 K are included.

List

See also
List of most massive stars
List of hottest stars
List of largest stars

References

coolest stars, list of
Stars, coolest